Luiza González da Costa Campos (born July 30, 1990) is a Brazilian rugby sevens player. She was selected as a member of the Brazil women's national rugby sevens team to the 2016 Summer Olympics. Luiza Campos is a student of Universidade Estácio.

Campos represented Brazil at the 2022 Rugby World Cup Sevens in Cape Town, they placed eleventh overall.

References

External links 
 
 
 
 
 

1990 births
Living people
Brazil international rugby sevens players
Female rugby sevens players
Olympic rugby sevens players of Brazil
Rugby sevens players at the 2016 Summer Olympics
South American Games gold medalists for Brazil
South American Games medalists in rugby sevens
Competitors at the 2018 South American Games
Rugby sevens players at the 2020 Summer Olympics
Brazilian female rugby union players
Brazil international women's rugby sevens players
Brazilian rugby sevens players